Wa Central is one of the constituencies represented in the Parliament of Ghana. It elects one Member of Parliament (MP) by the first past the post system of election. Wa Central is located in the Wa Municipal district  of the Upper West Region of Ghana.

Boundaries
The seat is located within the Wa Municipal District of the Upper West Region of Ghana. To the south is the Northern Region, to the east the Wa East District and to the west, the Wa West District. The Nadowli District liest to the north.

History 
The constituency was changed in 2004 by the Electoral Commission of Ghana by carving the Wa West constituency out of it.

Members of Parliament

Elections

See also 
 List of Ghana Parliament constituencies

References 

Parliamentary constituencies in the Upper West Region